Acalolepta griseofasciata is a species of beetle in the family Cerambycidae. It was described by Stephan von Breuning in 1935, originally under the genus Dihammus. It is known from Papua New Guinea, Vanuatu, and the Solomon Islands.

Subspecies
 Acalolepta griseofasciata albinea Vitali & Goussey, 2014
 Acalolepta griseofasciata griseofasciata (Breuning, 1935)
 Acalolepta griseofasciata perscissa Vitali & Goussey, 2014

References

Acalolepta
Beetles described in 1935